Kherson Province may refer to:

Kherson Oblast, subdivision of Ukraine
Kherson Governorate, subdivision of the Russian Empire

See also
 Kherson (disambiguation)